Helena Guttormsdotter, fl 1205, was a Swedish noble and landholder, known as the royal mistress of Valdemar II of Denmark. 

Helena was the daughter of the Swedish earl Guttorm jarl. She married the Danish noble Esbern Snare and became the mother of lady Ingeborg of Kalundborg. She was widowed in 1204, and had a relationship with Valdemar II, with whom she had Canute, Duke of Estonia. The relationship was terminated when he married Dagmar of Bohemia. Helena returned to Sweden, where she founded the chapel Vår Frus kapell in Linköping. She was a landholder in Sweden, and left her estates there to her son after her death.

References
 Dansk biografisk Lexikon / VII. Bind. I. Hansen - Holmsted / 

12th-century Danish people
12th-century Swedish people

13th-century Danish people
13th-century Swedish people
Mistresses of Danish royalty
13th-century Danish women
13th-century Swedish women
12th-century Swedish women